This is a list of the highest Mountain Peaks of the Twelve Districts of Himachal Pradesh, ranked by highest point and mountain peaks in Himachal Pradesh

Districts

References 

Highest points

Highest points of Indian states and union territories
Lists of highest points in Asia